Hawkins Street is a street in central Dublin, Ireland.

History
Hawkins Street dates from at least the early 1700s, with many of the buildings on the west side of the street having been built on former back gardens when D'Olier Street was widened as part of the Wide Streets Commission. This area of Dublin had been reclaimed from banks of the River Liffey by 1673. The street is named for  William Hawkins (c. 1618–1680) who had been the driving force behind the reclamation, funding 450 metres of walling himself.

In the medieval period, this area had a leprosy hospital.

Notable buildings

There have been five Theatre Royals  in Dublin's history, two of them in Hawkins Street. The third Theatre Royal was opened in the street in 1820. It burned to the ground in 1880. The fifth Theatre Royal opened in 1935.  In 1962, this was demolished to make way for a large office block development, Hawkins House and the Screen Cinema. Permission to demolish these buildings was granted in 2017.

The rear entrance of the Dublin Gas Company building built in 1928 is also on the western side of the street. This building, designed by Charles Herbert Ashworth is in the Arts and Crafts and English Tudor styles, in stark contrast to the art deco facade on D'Olier Street. The buildings are built to accommodate the laneway, Leinster Market.

Sheahan Memorial 

At the northern end of the street stands the Sheahan Memorial from 1906, which commemorates the place where a member of the Dublin Metropolitan Police, Constable Patrick Sheahan, died on duty. The memorial was designed by W. P. O'Neill, built by Harrison & Sons, and was moved to the side of the street in 2012. Its inscription reads, in English and Irish:

See also
List of streets and squares in Dublin

References

Citations

Sources

 

Streets in Dublin (city)